Daz Studio is a free media design software developed by Daz 3D. Daz Studio is a 3D scene creation and rendering application used to produce images as well as video. Renders can be done by leveraging either the 3Delight render engine, or the Iray render engine, both of which ship for free along with Daz Studio, or with a variety of purchasable add-on render engine plugins for Daz Studio from various vendors and companies.

Daz Studio also supports the import and export of various file formats for 3D objects and animations to allow for the use of other 3D content within Daz Studio, as well as to get content out of Daz Studio for use in other 3D applications.

Version 1.0 was released in Fall 2005. Until version 1.7 its logo was stylized as "DAZ|Studio". On February 1, 2012, Daz 3D announced it would be giving away Daz Studio Pro for free.

In 2017, Daz 3D also began offering Hexagon and Daz Studio together for free, thus adding 3D modeling capabilities to the Daz Studio offering.

Genesis figure technology 

One of the main differences between Daz Studio and other software applications such as Poser is that Daz 3D has also included support for its various generations of the "Genesis" technology which is used as the basis for its human figures.

Daz 3D has had many versions of its human figures and characters, but in 2011 they launched a significant change in the underlying technology.  Instead of each figure being designed individually, Daz 3D moved to their Genesis platform, in which figures were derived as morphs from the base mesh. Two of the key differences that this technology created were: The ability for characters to be blended into a huge variety of shapes, and since these shapes were all derived from a common base, add-on content like clothing, hair, and additional morphs would not only work on all characters, but could actually change with the characters.

The Genesis platform has gone through several versions since the launch in 2011:

Genesis 2: One of the shortcomings of the Genesis platform was that although it allowed extremely flexibility in the shape of characters and clothing, it also toned down some of the elements of what made a male or female figure unique.  Genesis 2 changed this by splitting the Genesis base figure into two separate base figures: Genesis 2 Male and Genesis 2 Female.

Genesis 3: Up until Genesis 3, the Genesis figures had been using TriAx Weight Maps, where many other industry platforms were using Dual Quaternion.  This changed in Genesis 3 to allow Daz 3D figures to be more compatible with other 3D software platforms as well as Game Development platforms.

Genesis 8: The jump in version naming from Genesis 3 to Genesis 8 was in order to address confusion in naming conventions.  Although Genesis had reached its fourth version, most of the Daz 3D flagship characters were now on their eight versions.  In order to avoid the confusion of Victoria 8 or Michael 8 being Genesis 4 characters, Daz 3D shifted the versioning of Genesis to match with the character versions. Genesis 8 also includes significant changes in the figure's backward compatibility with previous generations and their content as well as Joint and muscle bends and flexing and facial expressions.

Genesis 9: Genesis 9 was released in October 2022

History and overview 
Daz Studio is designed to allow users to manipulate relatively ready-to-use models and figures as well as other supporting 3D content. It is aimed at users who are interested in posing human and non-human figures for illustrations and animation. It was created as an alternative to Poser, the industry-leading software in use for character manipulation and rendering. Daz 3D began its business model selling 3D models of human beings (and a few non-humans), as well as giving away a few of the more popular base models for free from time to time, and clothing and props for the same, and all of these models were constructed to be used in Poser. Daz eventually created their own character-manipulation software, first for sale and later distributed for free (originally just the base edition, but eventually even the "pro" version). Initially, Daz Studio handled the same file formats that Poser did, but Daz eventually introduced Daz Studio-specific character and file formats (although they also introduced their DSON file importer to make it possible to import Daz Studio characters into Poser, while Daz Studio can still also import Poser object files).

Daz 3D follows the "Razor and blades business model": Daz Studio is the "razor", a free-of-charge core program with the required features for the creation of imagery and animations, while relegating other features to the "blades", add-on plug-ins, usually commercial, which the user may add. Initially, it was possible to easily create new content in another Daz program, Carrara. Beginning in 2017, Daz 3D began offering another of their programs, Hexagon, and distributing that as a package with Daz Studio.

In October 2017, Daz Studio added to the free offering the dForce physics engine, which Daz Studio uses for simulating the draping of cloth due to gravity, wind, and collision with other objects.

See also 
 List of 3D modeling software

References 

3D animation software
MacOS graphics software
Windows graphics-related software
Anatomical simulation
Video game development software
3D graphics software that uses Qt
Proprietary software that uses Qt